Solution Deployment Descriptor (SDD) is a standard XML-based schema defining a standardized way to express software installation characteristics required for lifecycle management in a multi-platform environment.

The SDD defines schema for two XML document types: Package Descriptors and Deployment Descriptors. Package Descriptors define characteristics of a package used to deploy a solution. Deployment Descriptors define characteristics of the content of a solution package, including the requirements that are relevant for creation, configuration, and maintenance of the solution content.

See also
OASIS (organization) (Organization for the Advancement of Structured Information Standards)

External links
OASIS SDD Page.
Solution Deployment Descriptor (SDD), Part 1: An emerging standard for deployment artifacts

XML-based standards